John Blair (September 13, 1790July 9, 1863) was an American slave owner and politician who represented Tennessee in the United States House of Representatives.

Biography
Blair was born in Blairs Mill near Jonesborough in the Southwest Territory, the son of John Blair, Jr., and attended Martin Academy. He graduated from Washington College in Tennessee in 1809. He studied law, was admitted to the bar in 1813, and began practicing.

Career
A member of the Tennessee House of Representatives between 1815 and 1817, Blair also served as a member of the Tennessee Senate between 1817 and 1821.

Blair was elected as a Jacksonian Republican to the Eighteenth Congress and re-elected as a Jacksonian to the Nineteenth through Twenty-third Congresses. He served as a U.S. Representative from March 4, 1823, to March 3, 1835.  During the Twentieth Congress, he was chairman of the U.S. House Committee on Expenditures in the State Department. He was chairman of the Committee on Expenditures in the Department of State (Twentieth Congress). He was an unsuccessful candidate for re-election to the Twenty-fourth Congress in 1834.

After retiring to private life, Blair again became a member of the Tennessee House of Representatives in 1849 and 1850. He resumed the practice of law.

Death
Blair died in Jonesboro, Tennessee on July 9, 1863, at age 72 years, 330 days. He is interred at Old Cemetery in Jonesboro.

References

External links

1790 births
1863 deaths
People from Washington County, Tennessee
Democratic-Republican Party members of the United States House of Representatives from Tennessee
Jacksonian members of the United States House of Representatives from Tennessee
Members of the Tennessee House of Representatives
Tennessee state senators
American slave owners